We Come to Play was the first and only album released by BUX in 1976. The album was originally recorded in 1973 but Capitol decided not to release it. In 1976, however, when lead guitarist Punky Meadows and bassist Mickie Jones had success with their band Angel, Capitol tried to cash in and finally released We Come to Play. The album is an interesting affair blending hard rock and the standard boogie band approach with varied results. "White Lightning", which later became a featured cut on Angel's third album, is included here with different lyrics and is interesting for its historical value.

Track listing
 "Crosstown Girl" – 3:29
 "Highway" – 4:30
 "It’s Your Baby" – 3:34
 "If You Want Love" – 4:45
 "White Lightning" – 5:06
 "Come on Down" – 3:30
 "Buy Me a Bottle" – 4:32
 "When Your Time Has Come" – 4:52
 "Next Train" – 5:30

Personnel
 Ralph Morman - Lead Vocals
  James Newlon - Lead Guitars
 Punky Meadows - Lead Guitars
  Mickie Jones - Bass
  Wiley Crawford - Keyboards/Lead Vocals
  Rocky Isaac - Drums

1976 albums
Capitol Records albums
Albums produced by Jack Douglas (record producer)